Dirk Korthals (born 22 March 1962 in Vreden) is a German former swimmer who competed in the 1984 Summer Olympics.

References

1962 births
Living people
People from Borken (district)
Sportspeople from Münster (region)
German male swimmers
German male freestyle swimmers
Olympic swimmers of West Germany
Swimmers at the 1984 Summer Olympics
Olympic silver medalists for West Germany
World Aquatics Championships medalists in swimming
European Aquatics Championships medalists in swimming
Medalists at the 1984 Summer Olympics
Olympic silver medalists in swimming
20th-century German people
21st-century German people